Michel Lewandowski (born Mieczyslaus Lewandowski; 28 May 1914 – 7 September 1990) was a professional footballer who played as a midfielder. He played his entire career in France and was a French military international.

Playing career 
Mieczyslaus Lewandowski was born in Waltrop in the Kingdom of Prussia, German Empire. He was of Polish descent. He played eleven matches for Lens in the 1938–39 Division 1. In 1945, he signed for Roubaix-Tourcoing. He won the 1946–47 Division 1 with the club before leaving in 1950, signing for JA Armentières that year.

Naturalized in February 1939, Lewandowski was selected for the France military national team.

Managerial career 
After his retiring from football, Lewandowski went on to coach US Billy-Berclau and AS Lens.

Honours 
Roubaix-Tourcoing

 Division 1: 1946–47

References 

1914 births
1990 deaths
People from Recklinghausen (district)
Sportspeople from Münster (region)
German footballers
German emigrants to France
French footballers
French people of Polish descent
German people of Polish descent

Association football midfielders
RC Lens players
CO Roubaix-Tourcoing players
Ligue 1 players
French football managers
German football managers
Footballers from North Rhine-Westphalia